Stuart Wilson is a Scottish sound engineer working in feature films.

He has been nominated for 7 Academy Awards, for the films War Horse in 2012, Skyfall in 2013, Star Wars: The Force Awakens in 2016, Rogue One in 2017, Star Wars: The Last Jedi in 2018, 1917 in 2020 and The Batman, winning the award for 1917. He was nominated for a British Academy Film Award for The Constant Gardener in 2006, Harry Potter and the Deathly Hallows – Part 2 and War Horse in 2012, Skyfall in 2013, Star Wars: The Force Awakens in 2016, Star Wars: The Last Jedi in 2018 and Star Wars: The Rise of Skywalker and 1917 in 2020. He won the award for the later.

Awards and nominations

References

External links
Official website

British audio engineers
Living people
Film people from Glasgow
Place of birth missing (living people)
Year of birth missing (living people)
Best Sound BAFTA Award winners
Best Sound Genie and Canadian Screen Award winners
Best Sound Mixing Academy Award winners